{{DISPLAYTITLE:(119951) 2002 KX14}}

, also written as 2002 KX14, is a medium-sized trans-Neptunian object (TNO) residing within the Kuiper belt. It was discovered on 17 May 2002 by Michael E. Brown and Chad Trujillo.

It has a semi-major axis, orbital period and orbital eccentricity close to that of a plutino. The orbital periods of plutinos cluster around 247.2 years (1.5 times Neptune's orbital period), close to 's orbital period. However,  is not a plutino, as it is not actually in a resonance with Neptune, and it may have formed near its present nearly circular orbit lying almost perfectly on the ecliptic. This TNO may have remained dynamically cold since its formation, and thus its orbit may not have been a direct result of significant perturbations from Neptune during its migration to the outer solar system. The Deep Ecliptic Survey (DES) currently classifies it as a cubewano (classical) based on a 10-million-year integration of the orbit.

 comes to opposition in late May at an apparent magnitude of 20.4. This makes it about 360 times fainter than Pluto.

See also
 Nice model

References

External links 
 (119951) 2002 KX14 Precovery Images (Archived)
 Stellar Occultation by (119951) 2002 KX14 on April 26, 2012
 

Classical Kuiper belt objects
2002 KX14
2002 KX14
Possible dwarf planets
20020517
Objects observed by stellar occultation